Jaber-e Ansar (also Romanized as Jāber-e Anşār; also known as Shahrak-e Jāber-e Anşār) is a village in Jaber-e Ansar Rural District, in the Central District of Abdanan County, Ilam Province, Iran. At the 2006 census, its population was 1,017, in 205 families.

References 

Populated places in Abdanan County